The 2002 USC Trojans football team represented the University of Southern California in the 2002 NCAA Division I-A football season.  USC ended the regular season ranked #5 in both the AP Poll and the Coaches' Poll.  Trojans quarterback Carson Palmer won the 2002 Heisman Trophy as the best college football player in America.  During the bowl games, USC had a convincing 38–17 win over #3 Iowa in the Orange Bowl.  USC became #4 in the final AP Poll and Coaches' Poll. Other notable players for the USC Trojans in 2002 include WR#2 Kareem Kelly, RB#21 Malaefou Mackenzie, QB#10 Matt Cassel, RB#4 Sultan McCullough,  RB#34 Hershel Dennis (FR) RB#25 Justin Fargas, RB#39 Sunny Byrd, RB#34 Chad Pierson, S#43 Troy Polamalu, WR#44 Gregg Guenther, TE#86 Dominique Byrd, WR#83 Keary Colbert, WR#1 Mike Williams, WR#7 Sandy Fletcher, WR#82 Donald Hale, TE#88 Doyal Butler, and WR#87 Grant Mattos.

The team was named national champion by both Dunkel and Matthews, and co-champion by Sagarin, all NCAA-designated major selectors, although none are claimed by the university.

Recruiting
USC was ranked highly (#12 by Scout, #13 by Rivals) for getting Darnell Bing, Manuel Wright, Winston Justice, Fred Matua, Tom Malone, Jason Mitchell, Hershel Dennis, Kyle Williams, Dominique Byrd, Dallas Sartz, Justin Wyatt, Chris McFoy, Mike Williams, LaJuan Ramsey, Oscar Lua and Brandon Hancock among others.

Schedule

Roster

Game summaries

Auburn

at Colorado

at Kansas State

Oregon State

Washington State

California

Washington

UCLA

    
    
    
    
    
    
    
    
    
    
    

Carson Palmer 19/32, 254 Yds, 4 TD
Kareem Kelly 4 Rec, 94 Yds, 1 TD

Notre Dame

    
    
    
    
    
    
    
    
    
    
    

Carson Palmer 32/46, 425 Yds
Justin Fargas 20 Rush, 120 Yds
Mike Williams 10 Rec, 169 Yds

vs. Iowa (Orange Bowl)

        
    
    
    
    
    
    
    
    

USC played third ranked Iowa in the Orange Bowl. The matchup featured the top two finalists for that season's Heisman Trophy; Trophy winner Carson Palmer and runner up Brad Banks. Banks was the quarterback for the Hawkeyes. The Hawkeyes had only lost one game all year and it was to their rival Iowa State. Iowa opened the play up with a bang and set an Orange Bowl record when C.J. Jones returned the opening kickoff of the game 100 yards for a touchdown. USC responded with a touchdown run on from running back Justin Fargas. Iowa regained the lead with a field goal from Nate Kaeding. USC would kick a field goal in the second quarter to even the score 10-10 at the half. USC came out in the second half and separated themselves from Iowa scoring twice in the third quarter to take a 24-10 lead. The first score was a pass from Palmer to Mike Williams and the second was another run from Fargas. USC ended the third quarter with the ball and scored quickly in the fourth quarter giving them a 31-10 lead. The lead grew when Iowa continued to be unable to do anything with the ball and USC took advantage on a rushing touchdown from fan favorite Sunny Byrd to make the score 38-10. Iowa would score off a touchdown pass from Banks however it was too late. USC would end up winning 38-17.

The Trojans dominated time of possession in the game, having control of the ball for 38:06 seconds. This allowed for the Trojans defense to rest while keeping the Iowa defense out on the field and making them tired. USC's defense did not give up a touchdown to Iowa until the fourth quarter of the game and forced Banks to throw his first interception since October 19.

2002 team players in the NFL
Marcell Allmond
Kevin Arbet
Collin Ashton
Darnell Bing
William Buchanon 
Dominique Byrd
Matt Cassel
Shaun Cody
Keary Colbert
Justin Fargas
Matt Grootegoed
Gregg Guenther
Alex Holmes
Norm Katnik
Kareem Kelly
Ryan Killeen
David Kirtman
Winston Justice
Jason Leach
Matt Leinart
Oscar Lua
Malaefou MacKenzie
Tom Malone
Grant Mattos
Fred Matua
Chris McFoy
Sultan McCullough
Jason Mitchell
Carson Palmer
Mike Patterson
Troy Polamalu
LaJuan Ramsey
Bernard Riley
Jacob Rogers
Frostee Rucker
Dallas Sartz
Lofa Tatupu
Kenechi Udeze
Lenny Vandermade
John Walker
Lee Webb
Kyle Williams
Mike Williams
Manuel Wright
Justin Wyatt

References

USC
USC Trojans football seasons
Pac-12 Conference football champion seasons
Orange Bowl champion seasons
USC Trojans football